Minegishi (written: 嶺岸, 峰岸 or 峯岸) is a Japanese surname. Notable people with the surname include:

, Filipino footballer
, Japanese footballer
, Japanese idol, singer and actress
, Japanese water polo player
, Japanese manga artist
, Japanese video game composer
, Japanese actor

Japanese-language surnames